The Teens in the Driver Seat (TDS) program is a peer-to-peer safety program for young drivers. More than 350 schools in Texas now have active TDS programs in place, and TDS has also become active in California, Connecticut and Georgia. At least 350,000 young people have participated in the program.

Developed and designed in 2002, its mission is to decrease the number of car crashes involving teens by increasing their knowledge of teen driving risks.

Teens in the Driver Seat is part of the Texas Transportation Institute and the Texas A&M University System. It is funded by the Texas Department of Transportation and State Farm Insurance - Texas Zone.

Process
TDS is made by teens for teens. The direction and content of the TDS program is driven by its target audience - teens. School and community-based teams draw upon the material resources provided by the program, and then (with assistance from TDS staff) develop their own action plans that reflect a teen perspective. The various approaches and tools created and used by active teams (including posters, videos, school activities, etc.) are often shared widely through Teen Team showcase pages on the TDS website.

References

External links
 Teens in the Driver Seat
 Texas Transportation Institute
 After GDL What's Next? The Role of Peer Influence in Reducing Car Crashes Among Young Drivers
 Effectiveness of the Teens in the Driver Seat Program
 Nighttime Fatal Crash Trends

Road safety organizations